Red Hill is a small town and rural community on the Mornington Peninsula in Melbourne, Victoria, Australia, approximately  south-east of Melbourne's Central Business District, located within the Shire of Mornington Peninsula local government area. Red Hill recorded a population of 1,009 at the 2021 census.

Red Hill is located in the hinterland of the Mornington Peninsula, about an hour's drive south of Melbourne.

History

Red Hill was so named due to the rich, red soil colour found in this locality. The area now known as Red Hill contains land in three parishes: Kangerong, Wannaeue (only 626 acres) and Balnarring. Kangerong is north of Arthurs Seat Road and west of Red Hill Road, Wannaeue is west of Mornington-Flinders Road. The rest of Red Hill and Red Hill South are in Balnarring parish.

Many Red Hill roads are named after early pioneering families: Sheehan, McIlroy, Stanley, Bayne, Herriott, Oscar, Oscar, Lolat, Nash, Prossor, Perry (sic) and Callanan.

Red Hill Post Office opened on 1st August, 1871.
A railway also operated here between 1921 and 1959, and was known as the Red Hill railway line.

Today

The town has an Australian rules football team, called the Hillmen, competing in the Mornington Peninsula Nepean Football League. They won their first Division Two premiership back in 1990. Their most recent Division Two premiership was 2019, which saw them move into Division One in 2020.

A monthly community market is held from September through May. Patrons can still watch old-time games like Pétanque being played and smell the roasting of chestnuts. Other traditional Australian foods such as meat pies and jam donuts are also sold.

Since the 1970s, wineries have been established around Red Hill to take advantage of the microclimates that suits cool-climate grapes, and especially pinot noir. Strawberries, cherries and apples are also grown and available seasonally at the farm door.

Notable residents
 Herbert Robinson (1876–1919) – later mayor of Albany, Western Australia, and member of the Parliament of Western Australia
 Brooke Satchwell (b. 1980) – actor, student at Red Hill School

See also
 Shire of Flinders – Red Hill was previously within this former local government area.

References

External links

 Red Hill and Main Ridge – Government tourism site

Mornington Peninsula
Western Port